Bourchier is an English surname, from French Boursier, keeper of the purse. Bourchier is the Norman pronunciation.

The Barons Bourchier, Barons Berners, Barons FitzWarin, Earls of Essex and Earls of Bath 

Robert Bourchier, 1st Baron Bourchier (died 1349), son of John Bourchier (died 1329), Judge of the Court of Common Pleas 
John Bourchier, 2nd Baron Bourchier (died 1400)
Bartholomew Bourchier, 3rd Baron Bourchier (died 1409)
Elizabeth Bourchier, 4th Baroness Bourchier (c. 1399 – 1433)
First husband: Hugh Stafford, jure uxoris 4th Baron Bourchier, later 1st Baron Stafford (died 1420)
Second husband: Lewis Robessart, jure uxoris 4th Baron Bourchier (died 1430)
Sir William Bourchier (died 1375)
William Bourchier, 1st Count of Eu (1374–1420)
Henry Bourchier, 1st Viscount Bourchier, 1st Earl of Essex, 5th Baron Bourchier (c. 1404 – 1483), Baroness Elizabeth's second cousin.
William, Viscount Bourchier (d. bef. 1480) 
Henry Bourchier, 2nd Earl of Essex, 2nd Viscount Bourchier, 6th Baron Bourchier (c. 1472 – 1540)
Anne Bourchier, 7th Baroness Bourchier (died 1571)
Cecile Bourchier
Walter Devereux, 1st Viscount Hereford (1488–1558)
Sir Richard Devereux (died 1547)
Walter Devereux, 1st Earl of Essex, 8th Baron Bourchier (1541–1576)
Robert Devereux, 2nd Earl of Essex, 9th Baron Bourchier (1566–1601)
Robert Devereux, 3rd Earl of Essex, 10th Baron Bourchier (1591–1646), abeyant.
Humphrey Bourchier, 1st and last Lord Bourchier of Cromwell (died 1471)
Sir John Bourchier (died 1495), jure uxoris 6th Baron Ferrers of Groby
Eleanor Bourchier (c. 1417 – 1474), Duchess of Norfolk, as wife to John de Mowbray, 3rd Duke of Norfolk.
William Bourchier, jure uxoris Baron Fitzwaryn (c. 1412 – bef. 1469)
Fulk Bourchier, 10th Baron FitzWarin (1445–1479)
John Bourchier, 1st Earl of Bath, 11th Baron FitzWarin (1470–1539)
John Bourchier, 2nd Earl of Bath, 12th Baron FitzWarin (1499–1561), commissioner at the trial of Lady Jane Grey.
Sir John Bourchier, Lord FitzWarin (1529–1556)
William Bourchier, 3rd Earl of Bath, 13th Baron FitzWarin (bef.1557–1623)
Edward Bourchier, 4th Earl of Bath, 14th Baron FitzWarin (1590–1636)
Hon. Sir George Bourchier (c. 1535 – 1605)
Henry Bourchier, 5th Earl of Bath (1593–1654)
Thomas Bourchier (c. 1404 – 1486), later cardinal
John Bourchier, 1st Baron Berners (died 1471)
Sir Humphrey Bourchier (died 1471), co-Constable of Windsor Castle 
John Bourchier, 2nd Baron Berners (1467–1533), one of Henry VIII's Chancellors of the Exchequer
Margaret Bourchier (c. 1468 – c. 1551/52), made Baroness Bryan in her own right by Henry VIII, mother of his mistress, Elizabeth Carew
Anne Bourchier, Baroness Dacre (1470–1530)
Sir Thomas Bourchier (died 1510), Constable of Windsor Castle

Other
Arthur Bourchier, English actor
Bourchier Wrey, 6th Baronet (c.1715 - 13 April 1784), politician
Claud Thomas Bourchier (22 April 1831- 19 November 1877), English officer
James David Bourchier (1850–1920), Irish journalist and political activist
John Bourchier (regicide) (1595–1660) - English Puritan and regicide of Charles I
John Bourchier (politician)
Murray Bourchier (4 April 1881 - 16 December 1937), Australian soldier and politician